Fr. Philip Dowley CM, (Dean Dowley) was an Irish priest and  Provincial of the Vincentians in Ireland. He was born to Maurice Dowley and Nora Corbett in 1788, Ballyknock, outside Carrick-on-Suir, Co. Waterford.
In 1812, entered Maynooth as a student for his native diocese of Waterford. He was Junior then Senior appointed Dean of Maynooth College but left it in 1834 to help set up the Vincentians in Dublin. He was just appointed vice-president of Maynooth in 1834 but resigned to follow four students who had left Maynooth to set up the Vincentians. Dean Dowley became their leader.
In 1840, Fr. Dowley and two others made their novitiate in Paris.

They set up a school in Ushers Quay in Dublin, but also a congregation house in Phibsboro, and St. Vincent's Castleknock College. In 1838, St. Peter's church was handed over to the Vincentians.

In 1848, when the province of the Congregation of the Mission was officially established in Ireland, Fr. Dowley became its first Provincial.

He acted as president of the seminary in Castleknock from its foundation, and stayed in the provincial residence at the college.

He died in Castleknock on 31 January 1864 and was succeeded by Fr McNamara.

References 

1788 births
People from County Waterford
Alumni of St Patrick's College, Maynooth
19th-century Irish Roman Catholic priests
Irish Vincentians
Castleknock College
1864 deaths